Margareta Beijer (1625–1675), was the managing director of the Swedish Post Office, Postverket from 1669 until 1673.  She was the fourth director of the Swedish Post Office, and the second female postmaster in Sweden after Gese Wechel, entitled Sveriges rikes postmästarinna (Postmistress of the Swedish Realm). She succeeded her spouse, Johan von Beijer, after his death in 1669.

From 1637 until 1722, eight percent (or 40) of the postmasters in Sweden were female. Women were excluded from service in the new regulation of 1722, and allowed again in 1863.

References

 Ingemar Lundkvist, Cirkeln är sluten för brevet, Under Strecket, SvD, 16 maj 2007.
 Forssell, Nils: Svenska Postverkets Historia, Stockholm, 1936.
 Mansdominans i förändring: om ledningsgrupper och styrelser : betänkande Av Sverige Utredningen om kvinnor på ledande poster i näringslivet, Stockholm, 2003

1625 births
1675 deaths
17th-century Swedish people
Postmasters-General
17th-century Swedish women
People of the Swedish Empire
17th-century civil servants